Thomas Brooke Benjamin, FRS (15 April 1929 – 16 August 1995) was an English mathematical physicist and mathematician, best known for his work in mathematical analysis and fluid mechanics, especially in applications of nonlinear differential equations.

Education and career
Benjamin was educated at Wallasey Grammar School on the Wirral, the University of Liverpool (BEng. 1950) and Yale University (MEng. 1952), before being awarded his doctorate at King's College, Cambridge in 1955. He was a fellow of King's from 1955 to 1964.

From 1979 until his death in 1995 he was Sedleian Professor of Natural Philosophy at the Mathematical Institute, University of Oxford, and a fellow of The Queen's College, Oxford.

Contributions
The Benjamin–Ono equation describes one-dimensional internal waves in deep water. It was introduced by Benjamin in 1967, and later studied also by Hiroaki Ono.
Another equation named after Benjamin, the Benjamin–Bona–Mahony equation, models long surface gravity waves of small amplitude. Benjamin studied it with Jerry L. Bona and J. J. Mahony in a 1972 paper.

References

External links

Alumni of King's College, Cambridge
English mathematicians
Fellows of the Royal Society
Fluid dynamicists
Members of the French Academy of Sciences
1929 births
1995 deaths
20th-century French mathematicians
Sedleian Professors of Natural Philosophy
Fellows of The Queen's College, Oxford